Jonkeria is an extinct genus of dinocephalians. Species were very large and omnivorous (although there is some dispute to this, e.g. Colbert 1969 p. 136), from the Tapinocephalus Assemblage Zone, Lower Beaufort Group, of the South African Karoo.

Description

The skull is nearly twice as long as wide, and the snout is elongated and provided with sharp incisors and large canines. The cheek teeth were small. The body is robustly built, and the limbs stout. According to Boonstra 1969 p. 38, Jonkeria cannot be distinguished from its relative Titanosuchus on cranial grounds, but only in limb length; Jonkeria having short and squat limbs, and Titanosuchus long ones.

Evidence of femoral osteomyelitis has been described in a fossilised specimen of J. parva. The authors attributed the cause of the pathology, characterised by bony spicules growing perpendicular to nonpathological fibrolamellar bone tissue, to a bacterial infection resulting from an attack by a predator, as evidenced by puncture marks on the femur.

Classification

About a dozen species have been named, including the type species, J. truculenta. At least some of the other species were synonymised by Boonstra 1969. There has been no recent review of the genus.

See also

 List of therapsids

References

 Boonstra, L. D. 1969, "The Fauna of the Tapincephalus Zone (Beaufort Beds of the Karoo)," Ann. S. Afr. Mus. 56 (1) 1-73, pp. 35–38
 Colbert, E. H., (1969), Evolution of the Vertebrates, John Wiley & Sons Inc (2nd ed.)
von Zittel, K.A (1932), Textbook of Paleontology, C.R. Eastman (transl. and ed), 2nd edition, Macmillan & Co. vol.2, p. 255

Tapinocephalians
Prehistoric therapsid genera
Guadalupian synapsids of Africa
Fossil taxa described in 1917
Taxa named by Egbert Cornelis Nicolaas van Hoepen